Charles Lambert may refer to:

Charles Lambert (economist), Deputy Under Secretary for the United States Department of Agriculture Marketing and Regulatory Programs
Charles Lambert de Sainte-Croix (1827–1889), French politician
Charles Saint Lambert (1793–1876), Franco-Chilean mining engineer and businessman
Charles Joseph Lambert (engineer) (1804–1864), French explorer and engineer
Charles Joseph Lambert (1826–1888), Chilean mining entrepreneur and engineer
Charles Lucien Lambert (1828–1896), American composer
Charles Lambert (Archdeacon of Hampstead) (1872–1954), British Anglican priest
Charles Lambert (Archdeacon of Lancaster) (1894–1983), British Anglican priest
Charles-Richard Lambert (1800–1862), American musician, conductor and music educator
Charles Lambert (author) (born 1953), English novelist and short-story writer
Charles Lambert (water polo) (1932–1990), French Olympic water polo player

See also
Charles de Lambert (disambiguation)
Charles Lambart (disambiguation)